IC 883 (also known as Arp 193, IRAS 13183+3423, PGC 46560 and UGC 8387) is an irregular galaxy that is about 321 million light years away from Earth. It is located in the constellation Canes Venatici. Its largest radius is 1.4 (131 thousand light years), and smallest 0.7 angular minutes (65 thousand light years). It was discovered by Rudolf Ferdinand Spitaler on May 1 1891.

References

Literature

External links

 
 The Mice Galaxies
 Photographic Catalogue of Deep Sky Objects in Canes Venatici

 
193
0833
Irregular galaxies
Luminous infrared galaxies
46560
08387
Astronomical objects discovered in 1891